The AGR-20 Advanced Precision Kill Weapon System (APKWS) is a design conversion  of Hydra 70 unguided rockets with a laser guidance kit to turn them into precision-guided munitions (PGMs).  APKWS is approximately one-third the cost and one-third the weight of the current inventory of laser-guided weapons, has a lower yield more suitable for avoiding collateral damage, and takes one quarter of the time for ordnance personnel to load and unload.

Development
Where possible the system utilizes existing Hydra 70 components such as launchers, rocket motors, warheads and fuzes.  The weapon bridges the gap between the Hydra 70 and AGM-114 Hellfire systems and provides a cost-effective method of engaging lightly armored point targets. APKWS is the U.S. government's only Program of Record for the semi-active, laser-guided 2.75-inch (70 millimeter) rocket.

It converts the Hydra 70 unguided rocket into a precision guided munition through the addition of a mid-body guidance unit developed by BAE Systems. The APKWS has also been successfully tested in live fire exercises with the Forges de Zeebrugge unguided rocket, converting it into a precision guided munition and demonstrating the technology can be used on other rocket types than the Hydra 70.

Design

The winning bidder for the APKWS II contract was the team of BAE Systems, Northrop Grumman and General Dynamics, beating the offerings from Lockheed Martin and Raytheon Systems.

The APKWS II uses the Distributed Aperture Semi-Active Laser Seeker (DASALS) technology. This system allows a laser seeker to be located in the leading edge of each of the forward control canards, working in unison as if they were a single seeker. This configuration allows existing warheads from the Hydra 70 system to be used without the need for a laser seeker in the missile nose.

The APKWS II system is composed of the launch platform, rockets equipped with the WGU-59/B mid-body guidance unit, the lengthened 7-tube LAU-68 F/A rocket launcher, the SCS 7 aiming cue (not needed for attack helicopters), and Fastpack PA-140 and CNU-711/E storage kits for rockets and guidance kits, respectively, to ensure they are safe in the field. The WGU-59/B mid-body guidance unit is equipped with DASALS seeker optics which deploy 0.5 seconds after launch.

Firing ranges are 1,100-5,000 meters, the former of which can be hit less than 5 seconds after firing.

A software upgrade of the APKWS will be applied starting in late 2021; the upgrade increases range by 30% by means of an optimized flight trajectory to engage targets at a steeper angle of attack, while also being qualified on both fixed- and rotary-wing aircraft in a single variant and improving the surface danger zone logic for better training range options.

In June 2021, BAE successfully tested the APKWS in a counter-unmanned aerial systems (C-UAS) role. An APKWS-equipped rocket was fitted with a proximity fuze and destroyed a Class 2 UAS. The proximity fuze enables it to intercept UAS at a lower cost than other methods, and due to the rocket's laser guidance that activates on launch it does not require locking on to the target before launch.

Specifications
 Length: 
 Diameter: 2.75 in (70 mm)
 Wingspan: 
 Weight: 
 Speed:  at max
 Range:  (rotary wing);  (fixed wing)
 Guidance: Semi-active laser homing
 CEP: <0.5 meters
 Motor: Existing Hydra 70 motors
 Warhead: Existing Hydra 70 warhead

Program status
 2002: APKWS development test series begins.
 April 2005: General Dynamics APKWS program cancelled due to poor test results.
 September 2005: Successful flight test of BAE APKWS II.
 October 2005: Competition re-opened as APKWS II.
 April 2006: BAE Systems selected as prime contractor for the APKWS II program.
 February 2007: Funding for program withdrawn in proposed FY2008 budget.

 May 2007: Successful flight test of BAE APKWS II in production-ready configuration.
 November 2008: Transfer of contract from US Army to US Navy.

Deployment
 March 2012: APKWS II achieves initial operating capability (IOC) and is sent to Afghanistan with United States Marine Corps.   Plans are to integrate it onto the MQ-8 Fire Scout.
 July 2012: BAE Systems receives full-rate production contract for APKWS from the U.S. Navy. The first FRP deliveries were in October 2012 and the company expected the next FRP option to be awarded by the end of 2012.
 September 2012: The Navy awards a contract to officially integrate the APKWS into the Fire Scout.
 October 2012: BAE announces its intention to modify the APKWS II to be fired from fixed-wing tactical fighter platforms.
 January 2013: Additional conversion kits ordered. No in flight failures during the 100 combat launches in Afghanistan to date.
 February 2013: APKWS launched from an A-10 Thunderbolt II.  Three sorties were conducted.  The first sortie carried the rocket and launcher, and the second sortie fired an inert, unguided rocket to ensure the weapon would separate from the aircraft.  Two armed rockets were fired during the third sortie from 10,000 and 15,000 feet.  The second rocket launched into a 70 knot headwind, and both impacted within inches of the target.  The Air Force is considering using the APKWS II operationally by 2015 if further testing is successful.
 March 2013: APKWS is integrated onto the Bell 407GT.
 April 2013: A UH-1Y Venom fired 10 APKWS rockets at stationary and moving small boat targets, scoring 100 percent accurate hits on single and multiple targets over water.  The engagement ranged from 2–4 km using inert Mk152 high explosive and MK149 flechette warheads.  The UH-1Y had the boats designated by an MH-60S.
 October 2013: APKWS successfully fired from an AH-64 Apache. Launch altitudes ranged from 300 ft to 1,500 ft. BAE wants airworthiness qualification on the Apache for international sales to AH-64 operators. 
 March 2014: LAU-61 G/A Digital Rocket Launcher (DRL) deployed with HSC-15.
 July 2014: BAE reveals that the APKWS has reached Early Operational Capability (EOC) with one squadron of MH-60S helicopters.  The MH-60R will be outfitted within "12-18 months."
 August 2014: APKWS tested on Australian Army Eurocopter Tiger at Woomera Test Range.  A helicopter was on the ground and fired seven rockets which successfully hit their targets.  The rocket could enter Australian service by early 2015 on army Tigers and navy MH-60R helicopters.
 November 2014: APKWS tested on Australian Army, 16 Aviation Brigade, Eurocopter Tigers, this time airborne, near Darwin. Tests included using APKWS to convert a Forges de Zeebrugge (FZ) unguided rocket into a laser precision-guided weapon. All 10 rockets struck within a metre of the laser spot.
 October 2015: US Army AH-64 Apache helicopters to field weapon in Iraq and Afghanistan.
 March 2016: First rocket variants for launch from fixed-wing aircraft shipped to Marine Corps Harriers.
 June 2016: APKWS deployed on USAF F-16 and A-10 as part of an urgent operational requirement.
 October 2016: Production rate increased to 5,000 a year.
 June 2016-January 2017: 200 APKWS used against ISIL targets, including 60 during the Battle of Mosul.
 February 2018: First operational deployment of APKWS on Marine Corps legacy F/A-18 Hornets.
 December 2019: US Air Force demonstrates air-to-air capability of AGR-20A to cue off Sniper Advanced Targeting Pod and intercept low-flying cruise missiles.

In December 2019, the 85th Test and Evaluation Squadron at Eglin AFB, Florida, conducted a test using APKWS rocket against a drone representing a cruise missile. By adapting the rocket for cruise missile defense, it can serve the same role as the much more expensive AIM-120 missile, according to an Air Force release. "The test was unprecedented and will shape the future of how the Air Force executes CMD," Col. Ryan Messer, commander of the 53d Wing at Eglin, said in a release. "This is a prime example of how the 53d Wing is using resources readily available to establish innovative ways that enhance combat capabilities for our combat units."

In June 2020, BAE announced they had completed test firings of the APKWS from a ground launcher for the first time. Several rockets were fired from an Arnold Defense-built launcher called the Fletcher designed specifically for ground vehicles, demonstrating the weapon's ability to address a demand for standoff ground-to-ground precision munitions for small ground units.

Foreign users
On 14 April 2014, the U.S. Navy signed an agreement with the Jordanian Air Force for the first international sale of the APKWS for use on the CN-235 gunship. Jordan received 110 units in late November 2015.

In November 2014, the State Department approved the sale of up to 2,000 APKWS rockets to Iraq.

In June 2015, a deal to sell 6 A-29 Super Tucano light attack aircraft to the Lebanese Air Force was approved that included the sale of 2,000 APKWS rockets for use on the turboprops. The  million sale was financed by Saudi Arabia.

In April 2018, The U.S. State Department approved the future sale of APKWS units to the Mexican Navy at the same time that they approved the sale of eight MH-60R helicopters.

Ukraine is being supplied with APKWS rockets following the 2022 Russia invasion of Ukraine. As part of an aid package announced by the U.S. in August 2022, the L3Harris Vehicle-Agnostic Modular Palletized ISR Rocket Equipment system will be sent to Ukraine. The system consists of a sensor ball and a four-barreled APKWS rocket launcher that can be mounted on trucks. While it can direct laser-guided rockets on ground targets, the Pentagon specified it as a counter-UAS system. The kit could be ready by May 2023. L3Harris was formally given a $40 million purchase order in January 2023. The award was part of a U.S. Navy prototype contract that pre-dated the war; field testing had begun in 2021 and after the system was submitted to the DOD in April 2022, range and durability tests were conducted in the summer. 14 kits will be installed on vehicles the U.S. provides Ukraine, with four systems to be delivered by mid-2023 and 10 more by the end of the year.

Launch platforms

Current rotary wing:
UH-1Y Venom
AH-1W SuperCobra
AH-1Z Viper
Bell 407GT
AH-64 Apache
Eurocopter Tiger
MH-60S/R Seahawk
Current fixed-wing
AV-8B Harrier II
OV-10 Bronco
F-16 Fighting Falcon
F/A-18 Hornet
A-10 Thunderbolt II
Planned rotary wing
MQ-8 Fire Scout
OH-58 Kiowa (company funded)
V-22 Osprey
AH-6 Little Bird
Planned fixed-wing
A-29 Super Tucano
CN-235
 Vehicle-Agnostic Modular Palletized ISR Rocket Equipment (VAMPIRE)
 A portable kit that can be installed on most vehicles with a cargo bed for the launching of the APKWS II laser-guided rockets or other laser-guided munitions.

See also
 Low-Cost Guided Imaging Rocket
 Direct Attack Guided Rocket
 Guided Advanced Tactical Rocket
 List of laser articles
 Roketsan Cirit
 Ugroza

References

External links
 APKWS - BAE
 Distributed Aperture Semi-Active Laser Seeker (DASALS) - BAE Systems
 Hydra-70 Rockets: From Cutbacks to the Future of Warfare - Defense Industry Daily
 Advanced Precision Kill Weapon System - Defense Update
 Laser Guided APKWS II Rockets for USMC Harrier, Air Combat Command’s Warthog - Defense-Update
 Advanced Precision Kill Weapon System (APKWS) - Global Security
 

Air-to-surface missiles of the United States
Military equipment introduced in the 2010s